Martin Ruhe (born 1965) is a German cinematographer working on films, commercials, and music videos. A member of the American Society of Cinematographers, he is perhaps best known for his work on the miniseries Catch-22 (2019), as well as the films Control (2007) and The Midnight Sky (2020), for which he was nominated for a British Independent Film Award and a Satellite Award, respectively.

Life 
Martin Ruhe became interested in cinema as a teenager and wanted to become a director. After graduating from school, he completed a two-year training course as a focus puller. 

Afterwards he moved to London, where he worked as a runner for a camera rental company. He then became a cinematographer and filmed more than 200 music videos for artists such as Herbert Grönemeyer, Depeche Mode and Coldplay as well as 350 advertising spots. For Thorsten Wettcke Ruhe filmed the short film Die Rosenfalle (1998) and the feature film Ein göttlicher Job (2001). On the recommendation of Herbert Grönemeyer Ruhe met Anton Corbijn, wo engaged him for his Ian Curtis biopic Control. He gained further prominence for his work on the film Harry Brown. Since then Ruhe was engaged for various international productions. In 2010 he worked again with Anton Corbijn on The American, a thriller starring George Clooney. In 2016 he filmed Ewan McGregor's directorial debut American Pastoral. For George Clooney Ruhe filmed the science fiction film The Midnight Sky.

Filmography 
Film

Television

References

External links 
 Official website
 

1965 births
Living people
German cinematographers
People from Paderborn
University of Seville alumni